The Battle of Kashii (樫井の戦い) was the very first battle of the Summer Campaign of the 1615 Siege of Osaka, near the beginning of the Edo period in Japan. It took place on the 26th day of the 4th month of the Keichō era.

As the Shōgun's Eastern Army prepared to renew the siege begun the previous winter, the Ōsaka garrison sallied forth, ambushing Tokugawa forces in a number of skirmishes and sieges. In the battle of Kashii, a contingent of forces loyal to Toyotomi Hideyori, lord of Ōsaka, attempted to besiege Wakayama Castle, which was controlled by Asano Nagaakira, an ally of the shōgun. The attackers were led by Ōno Harunaga, Ban Naoyuki, and Okabe Noritsuna.

Asano's garrison realized that their attackers were far from support or reinforcements, and met them in battle at Kashii, a short distance from Wakayama. Okabe and Ban were killed in the battle, and Ōno was therefore forced to retreat back to Ōsaka.

References
Turnbull, Stephen (1998). 'The Samurai Sourcebook'. London: Cassell & Co.

Kashii 1615
1615 in Japan
Kashii
Kashii